Hemeroplanes longistriga is a moth of the  family Sphingidae.

Distribution 
It is known from Brazil and Ecuador.

Description 
It differs from all other Hemeroplanes species by the very long silver mark on the forewing upperside and lack of yellow bands on the upperside of the abdomen.

Biology 
There are probably at least two generations per year. Adults have been recorded in December in Brazil.

References

Dilophonotini
Moths described in 1903